Rixheim (Alsatian: Rixe) is a commune in the Haut-Rhin department in Grand Est in northeastern France. It forms part of the Mulhouse Alsace Agglomération, the inter-communal local government body for the Mulhouse conurbation.

Geography 
Rixheim lies 5 kilometers east from the city center of Mulhouse, at the crossroads of Strasbourg and Mulhouse (A35-A36 to Sausheim) and Habsheim to Ottmarsheim (ancient Roman roads), the municipality of Rixheim is located in a loop of the Rhine ditch on the borders of the Hardt forest, the Sundgauvian hills and the alluvial plain of the Jll. The altitudes vary between 365 meters (Zürenwald) and 232 meters (Pont du Bouc).
Rixheim lies six Kilometer east of Mulhouse.

There was a commendam of the Teutonic Order, their buildings preserved to this day, were built by Johann Caspar Bagnato. It was under the command of the commendam Altshausen.

Neighbouring communes 
The neighbouring communes of Rixheim are, clockwise, starting in the north:

 Sausheim
 Ottmarsheim 
 Hombourg
 Zimmersheim
 Habsheim
 Bruebach
 Riedisheim
 Illzach

Population

Education 
Rixheim has a public secondary school, the College Captain Dreyfus. It also has 4 elementary schools.

Twin towns 
  Lohne, Germany, Niedersachsen, Germany (since 1987)
  San Vito al Tagliamento, Friaul-Julisch Venetien, Italy
  Kanton Valence-sur-Baïse, Midi-Pyrénées, France

Notable places 
 The former Commandery of the Teutonic Order
 The Saint-Léger church, with organ and the old presbytery
 Fountain of John of Nepomuk
 War memorial
 The museum of wallpaper

See also 
 Communes of the Haut-Rhin department

References

External links 

  

Communes of Haut-Rhin